Sungai Besi (formerly known as Sungei Besi) (English: Steel River) is a town and suburb within the Federal Territory of Kuala Lumpur. It was also a federal constituency in Kuala Lumpur from 1974 to 1995. Sungai Besi was a historical mining town with many heavy industries such as steelworks, waste steel plants and other steel industries. Sungei Besi Tin Mine site was the largest and deepest open cast alluvial tin mine in the world and in Malaysia. The town has since developed from a large area of village settlements.

Background and progress
The town is still in its original settings. The village structures are from the early days of the town. Most of the buildings are built from wood and the pathways are narrow. There is also a modest century-old Chinese temple ( 仙四師爺廟(新街場) ) which is founded in 1901 inside the town area. 

The vibrant area of Sungai Besi is located within the shops and the area near with the police station. Sungai Besi has many street vendors and traders in wet markets who sell mostly food items and fruits.

The Sungei Besi Tin Mine site was once upon a time the largest and deepest open cast alluvial tin mine in the world, as deep as 100 metres in some parts of the pit and with dangerously unstable slopes. Today, the site has been developed and occupied by Mines Wellness City. 

Sungai Besi is also known for the Sungai Besi Airport (Simpang Airport) which was once the main airport for Kuala Lumpur until 1965, where it got relocated to Subang International Airport. The airport then housed the RMAF Museum and the Sungai Besi Air Base. It was used by the Royal Malaysian Air Force as well as the Police, Fire and Rescue services for aviation purposes until it ceased operations in early 2018 to make way for the construction of MRT stations and Bandar Malaysia development project.

Accessibility and transport
The township is easily accessible from the North–South Expressway Southern Route. The road into the township is only 400 metres from the Sungai Besi Expressway exit.

The main road in Sungai Besi is Jalan Pasar which is the main trading centre. Sometimes, it is packed with heavy vehicles and cars of many tourists who are in town to enjoy Sungai Besi's famed seafood. 

The township is also served by the  Sungai Besi LRT Station on the  Sri Petaling line of Kuala Lumpur's Light Rapid Transit system.

References 

Suburbs in Kuala Lumpur